Tarzana may refer to:

Tarzana, Los Angeles, a neighborhood of Los Angeles, California
Tarzana, the Wild Girl, Italian: Tarzana, sesso selvaggio, 1969 Italian adventure film written and directed by Guido Malatesta
Tarzana Kid, 1974 album by American singer-songwriter John Sebastian

See also
Tarzanaq, a village in Khanandabil-e Gharbi Rural District, in the Central District of Khalkhal County, Ardabil Province, Iran
Tarzan (disambiguation)